Leopold may refer to:

People
 Leopold (given name)
 Leopold (surname)

Arts, entertainment, and media

Fictional characters 
 Leopold (The Simpsons), Superintendent Chalmers' assistant on The Simpsons
 Leopold Bloom, the protagonist of James Joyce's Ulysses
 Leopold "Leo" Fitz, a character on the television series Agents of S.H.I.E.L.D.
 Leopold "Butters" Stotch, a character on the television series South Park
 General Leopold von Flockenstuffen, a character in the BBC sitcom 'Allo 'Allo!
 Leopold the Cat, Russian cartoon character

Other arts, entertainment, and media
 Leopold (prize), a biennial German prize for music for children
 Kate & Leopold, 2001 romantic comedy film
 King Leopold's Ghost, popular history book by Adam Hochschild
 "King Leopold's Soliloquy", 1905 pamphlet by Mark Twain.
 Leopold the Cat, television series
 Léopold Nord & Vous, Belgian musical band

Brands and enterprises 
Leopold (publisher), a Netherlands-based publishing company
Leopold Bros., Denver micro-distillers
Leopold's Ice Cream, business in Savannah, Georgia, U.S.

Military hardware
Leopold,  Krupp K5 railway gun
 F930 Leopold I, Karel Doorman class frigate of the Naval Component of the Belgian Armed Forces
 USS Leopold (DE-319), American warship

Places

Australia
 Leopold, Victoria
 King Leopold Ranges, now named Wunaamin Miliwundi Ranges, range of hills in the Kimberley region of Western Australia

Austria
 Leopold Museum, Vienna, Austria

Belgium
 Espace Léopold, buildings housing the European Parliament, Brussels, Belgium
 Leopold Canal (Belgium), northern Belgium
 Leopold Park, public park in Brussels, Belgium
 Leopold Quarter, district of Brussels, Belgium

Canada
 Leopold Island, Nunavut
 Prince Leopold Island, Nunavut
 Port Leopold, Nunavut

Congo
 Leopoldville, now named Kinshasa

Germany
 Leopold Canal (Baden-Württemberg), Germany

Haiti
Leopold, Grand'Anse, a village in the Jérémie commune

India
 Leopold Cafe, in Colaba, Mumbai (attacked during the 26 November 2008 Mumbai attacks)

United States
 Leopold, Indiana
 Leopold, Missouri
Leopold, West Virginia
 Leopold Hotel, Bellingham, Washington 
 Leopold Township, Perry County, Indiana

United Kingdom
 Leopold Square, Sheffield, England, mixed development

Other uses
 Leopold's maneuvers, technique in obstetrics
 Order of Leopold (disambiguation), Ceremonial orders
 Royal Léopold Club, Belgian sports club in Uccle
 R. Léopold Uccle Forestoise, Belgian football club formed from merger of Léopold Club with other teams

See also
 Leopoldville (disambiguation)
 Leopoldina (disambiguation)